David Gagikovich Oganisyan (born 12 May 1994) is a Russian sambo and judo practitioner. He has had more success in sambo in recent years, winning European and World Championships titles in 90 kg. Oganisyan participated in international judo tournaments in early years, in recent years he had some success in regional tournaments.
He is of Armenian descent.

References

1994 births
Living people
Russian sambo practitioners
Russian male judoka
Russian people of Armenian descent
20th-century Russian people
21st-century Russian people